Fariba Fahroo is an American Persian mathematician, a program manager at the Air Force Office of Scientific Research, and a former program manager at the Defense Sciences Office. Along with I. M. Ross, she has published papers in pseudospectral optimal control theory.

The Ross–Fahroo lemma and the Ross–Fahroo pseudospectral method are named after her. In 2010, she received (jointly with Ross), the AIAA Mechanics and Control of Flight Award for fundamental contributions to flight mechanics.

In 2019, she was named a Fellow of the Society for Industrial and Applied Mathematics "for outstanding scientific leadership while managing AFOSR and DARPA programs in dynamics and control and computational mathematics and fundamental research accomplishments in computational optimal control". She was named to the 2021 class of Fellows of the American Association for the Advancement of Science.

See also
Ross–Fahroo pseudospectral methods
Ross–Fahroo lemma
Flat pseudospectral methods

Selected publications

References

Numerical analysts
21st-century American mathematicians
American women mathematicians
Living people
American people of Iranian descent
21st-century women mathematicians
Year of birth missing (living people)
Fellows of the Society for Industrial and Applied Mathematics
Fellows of the American Association for the Advancement of Science
21st-century American women